JoAnne Worley (born September 6, 1937) is an American actress, comedian, and singer. Her work covers television, films, theater, game shows, talk shows, commercials, and cartoons. Worley is widely known for her work on the comedy-variety show Rowan & Martin's Laugh-In.

Early life and education 
Worley was born on September 6, 1937, in Lowell, Indiana, the third child of Rose Irene (née Gardner) and Joseph Lauraine Worley. In 1962, her parents divorced and her father remarried, having four children with his second wife, Nancy.

Always known for her loud voice, Worley once said that when she attended church as a little girl, she never sang the hymns but would only lip sync them for fear that she would drown out everyone else. Before graduating from high school, she was named school comedienne.

After graduating from high school in 1955, Worley moved to Blauvelt, New York, where she began her professional career as a member of the Pickwick Players. This led to a drama scholarship to Midwestern State University in Wichita Falls, Texas.

Career 

After studying at Midwestern for two years, Worley moved to Los Angeles to study at Los Angeles City College and the Pasadena Playhouse. She was soon given her first musical role in a production of Wonderful Town. In 1961, Worley received her first major break when she appeared in the musical revue Billy Barnes People in Los Angeles; this production moved to Broadway, where it ran for only six performances. However, the New York Times reviewer wrote: "Jo Anne Worley has an earthy style that suggests she could be a rowdy comedienne." In 1964, she was selected to appear as a stand-in on the original Broadway production of Hello, Dolly! One year later, Worley created her own nightclub act in Greenwich Village, where she was discovered by Merv Griffin in 1966.

Impressed by Worley's talents, Griffin engaged her to be one of his primary guest stars on his show, where she made approximately 40 appearances on The Merv Griffin Show. In 1966, she appeared Off-Broadway in The Mad Show, a musical revue based on Mad Magazine. In 1967, Worley's stint on Griffin's show led to her discovery by George Schlatter, who soon cast her in Rowan & Martin's Laugh-In.

In 1970, Worley left Laugh-In to pursue other projects and has made guest appearances on several television series, including Love, American Style, The Tonight Show Starring Johnny Carson, The Andy Williams Show, Adam-12, Emergency!, Murder, She Wrote, The Middle, and different game shows such as Super Password, Hollywood Squares, and the many versions of Pyramid. She continued working in various movies, television series, and theatrical performances (original productions and revivals alike) over the years. Worley also became known for her work as a voice provider for several cartoons, animated movies, and video games. Her voice work includes Nutcracker Fantasy (1979), the Disney movies Beauty and the Beast (1991), A Goofy Movie (1995), Beauty and the Beast: Belle's Magical World (1998), and the voice of the Wardrobe in the video game Kingdom Hearts II (2005). She remains involved with Disney, making cameos in several Disney Channel sitcoms such as Kim Possible playing the role of Bonnie Rockwaller's mother, Wizards of Waverly Place, and Jessie.

Worley performed in regional theater, such as the Melody Top Theater in Milwaukee, Wisconsin, where she appeared in Gypsy: A Musical Fable as Rose (1984), Annie Get Your Gun (1982), Hello Dolly! (1980), Anything Goes (1978) and Once Upon a Mattress (1974), She also appeared at the Welk Dinner Theater in San Diego, California in Same Time, Next Year in 1985, Call Me Madam at the California Music Theatre, Pasadena, California, in 1987, and Nunsense at the La Mirada Theatre for the Performing Arts, La Mirada, California, in 1991.

In 1989, Worley returned to Broadway to appear in Prince of Central Park, but the show was canceled after four performances. She was cast as the Wicked Witch of the West in a 1999 musical production of The Wizard of Oz, directed and adapted by Robert Johanson, with Mickey Rooney playing the eponymous role. The production had a limited run at the Pantages Theater, Hollywood, California, and at the Theater at the Theater at Madison Square Garden, and she also joined the limited US tour. Worley played Mrs. Tottendale in the Broadway musical, The Drowsy Chaperone at the Marquis Theatre from July through December 2007. She then reprised the role of Mrs. Tottendale at The Cape Playhouse from June to July 2015.

From January 8 until August 24, 2008, Worley played the role of Madame Morrible in the Los Angeles production of Wicked.

Personal life 
Worley married actor Roger Perry on May 11, 1975. They divorced in 2000. 

Worley is an animal lover. For more than 40 years she has been involved with the organization Actors and Others for Animals, founded in 1971, which funds spay-and-neuter programs, and provides veterinary financial assistance to pet guardians in Southern California. She served on a voluntary basis on the board of directors for several years before becoming vice president, and since 2007, has served as president of the organization.

Filmography

Film

Television

Stage Roles

Video games

References 
Citations

Sources

External links 
 
 
 
 

1937 births
Actresses from Indiana
American film actresses
American musical theatre actresses
American television actresses
American sketch comedians
American voice actresses
American video game actresses
Living people
Los Angeles City College alumni
Midwestern State University alumni
People from Lowell, Indiana
People from Greater Los Angeles
People from Blauvelt, New York
21st-century American women